Sophie Divry, (born 1979 in Montpellier) is a French writer.

Between 2004 and 2010, she was a journalist at the monthly . Since 2016, she has been a participant on the radio program  on France Culture.

Works 
2010: La Cote 400, Montréal-Paris, Canada-France, Éditions Les Allusifs, 64 p.  - rééd. 10/18, 2013.
 - translated into English under the title The Library of Unrequited Love, by Siân Reynolds 
 - Aso translated into Ccastillan, Catalan, Swedish, Italian and persian.
2013: Journal d’un recommencement, Lausanne, Switzerland, Éditions Noir sur Blanc, series "Notabilia", 80 p. 
2014: La Condition pavillonnaire, Lausanne, Éditions Noir sur Blanc, series "Notabilia", 262 p. .
- Prix Wepler 2014 (Mention Spéciale). 
 - translated into English under the title Madame Bovary of the Suburbs, by Alison Anderson. 
2015: Quand le diable sortit de la salle de bain, Lausanne, Suisse, Éditions Noir sur Blanc, series "Notabilia", 144 p.  
- translated into Spanish under the title Cuando le diablo salio del bano, by Maria Enguix 
 - Prix Trop Virilo 2015.

References

External links 
 Sophie Divry on Babelio
 Sophie Divry on Noir sur Blanc 
 Quand le diable sortit de la salle de bain, Sophie Divry on Éditions Noir sur Blanc
 Sophie Divry se joue de la condition littéraire on L'Express (7 September 2015)
 Sophie dans la dèche, Divry dans l’invention on Le Monde (3 September 2015)
 Sophie Divry met sa fantaisie débridée au service de la lutte des classes on Le Temps (11 September 2015)
 Sophie Divry - La cote 400 on  YouTube

21st-century French novelists
Writers from Montpellier
1979 births
Living people
21st-century French women writers